Corythucha elegans, the willow lace bug, is a bug species in the family Tingidae found on willows in North America.

References

External links 

 

Tingidae
Insects described in 1918
Hemiptera of North America